The 2020 Montreal Impact season was the club's 27th season of existence, and their 9th in Major League Soccer, the top tier of the American soccer pyramid. This was the last season as the Impact, as they are now known as Club de Foot Montréal.

Around September and towards the end of the season, COVID-19 cross-border restrictions imposed by the Canadian government forced Montreal Impact to play the remaining home matches at Red Bull Arena in Harrison, New Jersey.

Squad
Source, As of November 5, 2020:

International roster slots 
Montreal currently has nine MLS International Roster Slots for use in the 2020 season. Montreal has eight slots allotted from the league and the team acquired three spots in trades with the Portland Timbers, D.C. United and Nashville SC. Montreal has also sold two slots to Orlando City SC and Philadelphia Union.

Player movement

In 
Per Major League Soccer and club policies terms of the deals do not get disclosed.

Out

Loans in

Loans out

Draft picks

International caps 
Players called for senior international duty during the 2020 season while under contract with the Montreal Impact.

Friendlies

Review

Pre-Season

Major League Soccer

Review

March

Tables

Eastern Conference

MLS is Back – Group C

Overall

Results summary

Matches
Unless otherwise noted, all times in EST

MLS Cup Playoffs

Canadian Championship

Qualification

As part of the MLS regular season, Canada's three Major League Soccer clubs will play each other three times from August 18 to September 16. The team with the most points from this series will qualify for the Canadian Championship.

CONCACAF Champions League

Bracket

Matches

Round of 16

Quarter-finals

Statistics

Appearances, Minutes Played, and Goals Scored 
{| class="wikitable sortable alternance" Style="text-align:  center;font-size:95%"
|-
! rowspan="2"|  !! rowspan="2"|  !! rowspan="2"| Player !! colspan="3"| Total !! colspan="3"| Major League Soccer !! colspan="3"| MLS Cup Playoffs !! colspan="3"| CONCACAF CL !!colspan="3"| MLS is Back Knockout !! rowspan="2"| 
|-
!  !!  !!  !!  !!  !!  !!  !!  !!  !!  !!  !!  !!  !!  !! 
|-
! colspan="19"| Goalkeepers
|-
| 23
| 
| Clément Diop
| style="background:#DCDCDC"| 26 
| style="background:#DCDCDC"| 2340
| style="background:#DCDCDC"| 0 
| 20 
| 1800 
| 0 
| style="background:#DCDCDC"| 1 
| style="background:#DCDCDC"| 90 
| style="background:#DCDCDC"| 0 
| 4 
| 360 
| 0 
| style="background:#DCDCDC"| 1 
| style="background:#DCDCDC"| 90 
| style="background:#DCDCDC"| 0 
| 
|-
| 40
| 
| Jonathan Sirois
| style="background:#DCDCDC"| 0 
| style="background:#DCDCDC"| 0 
| style="background:#DCDCDC"| 0 
| 0 
| 0 
| 0 
| style="background:#DCDCDC"| 0 
| style="background:#DCDCDC"| 0 
| style="background:#DCDCDC"| 0 
| 0 
| 0 
| 0 
| style="background:#DCDCDC"| 0 
| style="background:#DCDCDC"| 0 
| style="background:#DCDCDC"| 0 
| 
|-
| 41
| 
| James Pantemis
| style="background:#DCDCDC"| 3 
| style="background:#DCDCDC"| 270 
| style="background:#DCDCDC"| 0 
| 3 
| 270 
| 0 
| style="background:#DCDCDC"| 0 
| style="background:#DCDCDC"| 0 
| style="background:#DCDCDC"| 0 
| 0 
| 0 
| 0 
| style="background:#DCDCDC"| 0 
| style="background:#DCDCDC"| 0 
| style="background:#DCDCDC"| 0 
| 
|-
! colspan="19"| Defenders
|-
| 4
| 
| Rudy Camacho
| style="background:#DCDCDC"| 17 
| style="background:#DCDCDC"| 1386 
| style="background:#DCDCDC"| 1 
| 14 
| 1189 
| 1 
| style="background:#DCDCDC"| 1 
| style="background:#DCDCDC"| 90 
| style="background:#DCDCDC"| 0 
| 2 
| 107 
| 0 
| style="background:#DCDCDC"| 0 
| style="background:#DCDCDC"| 0 
| style="background:#DCDCDC"| 0 
| 
|-
| 5
| 
| Luis Binks
| style="background:#DCDCDC"| 26 
| style="background:#DCDCDC"| 2212 
| style="background:#DCDCDC"| 0 
| 21 
| 1762 
| 0 
| style="background:#DCDCDC"| 1 
| style="background:#DCDCDC"| 90 
| style="background:#DCDCDC"| 0 
| 3 
| 270 
| 0 
| style="background:#DCDCDC"| 1 
| style="background:#DCDCDC"| 90 
| style="background:#DCDCDC"| 0 
| 
|-
| 7
| 
| Rod Fanni
| style="background:#DCDCDC"| 17 
| style="background:#DCDCDC"| 1379 
| style="background:#DCDCDC"| 0 
| 12 
| 947 
| 0 
| style="background:#DCDCDC"| 1 
| style="background:#DCDCDC"| 90 
| style="background:#DCDCDC"| 0 
| 3 
| 270 
| 0 
| style="background:#DCDCDC"| 1 
| style="background:#DCDCDC"| 72 
| style="background:#DCDCDC"| 0 
| 
|-
| 12
| 
| Mustafa Kizza
| style="background:#DCDCDC"| 3 
| style="background:#DCDCDC"| 154 
| style="background:#DCDCDC"| 0 
| 1 
| 19 
| 0 
| style="background:#DCDCDC"| 1 
| style="background:#DCDCDC"| 45 
| style="background:#DCDCDC"| 0 
| 1 
| 90 
| 0 
| style="background:#DCDCDC"| 0 
| style="background:#DCDCDC"| 0 
| style="background:#DCDCDC"| 0 
| 
|-
| 15
| 
| Zachary Brault-Guillard
| style="background:#DCDCDC"| 27 
| style="background:#DCDCDC"| 2284 
| style="background:#DCDCDC"| 0 
| 21 
| 1789 
| 0 
| style="background:#DCDCDC"| 1 
| style="background:#DCDCDC"| 90 
| style="background:#DCDCDC"| 0 
| 4 
| 315 
| 0 
| style="background:#DCDCDC"| 1 
| style="background:#DCDCDC"| 90 
| style="background:#DCDCDC"| 0 
| 
|-
| 16
| 
| Joel Waterman
| style="background:#DCDCDC"| 10 
| style="background:#DCDCDC"| 756 
| style="background:#DCDCDC"| 0 
| 7 
| 548 
| 0 
| style="background:#DCDCDC"| 0 
| style="background:#DCDCDC"| 0 
| style="background:#DCDCDC"| 0 
| 3 
| 208 
| 0 
| style="background:#DCDCDC"| 0 
| style="background:#DCDCDC"| 0 
| style="background:#DCDCDC"| 0 
| 
|-
| 22
| 
| Jukka Raitala
| style="background:#DCDCDC"| 18 
| style="background:#DCDCDC"| 1530
| style="background:#DCDCDC"| 0 
| 15
| 1350
| 0 
| style="background:#DCDCDC"| 0 
| style="background:#DCDCDC"| 0 
| style="background:#DCDCDC"| 0 
| 2 
| 135 
| 0 
| style="background:#DCDCDC"| 1 
| style="background:#DCDCDC"| 45 
| style="background:#DCDCDC"| 0 
| 
|-
| 24
| 
| Karifa Yao
| style="background:#DCDCDC"| 2 
| style="background:#DCDCDC"| 127 
| style="background:#DCDCDC"| 0 
| 2
| 127
| 0 
| style="background:#DCDCDC"| 0 
| style="background:#DCDCDC"| 0 
| style="background:#DCDCDC"| 0 
| 0 
| 0 
| 0 
| style="background:#DCDCDC"| 0 
| style="background:#DCDCDC"| 0 
| style="background:#DCDCDC"| 0 
| 
|-
| 26
| 
| Jorge Corrales
| style="background:#DCDCDC"| 19 
| style="background:#DCDCDC"| 1474 
| style="background:#DCDCDC"| 0 
| 14 
| 1069 
| 0 
| style="background:#DCDCDC"| 1 
| style="background:#DCDCDC"| 45 
| style="background:#DCDCDC"| 0 
| 3 
| 270 
| 0 
| style="background:#DCDCDC"| 1 
| style="background:#DCDCDC"| 90 
| style="background:#DCDCDC"| 0 
| 
|-
| 33
| 
| Keesean Ferdinand
| style="background:#DCDCDC"| 0 
| style="background:#DCDCDC"| 0 
| style="background:#DCDCDC"| 0 
| 0 
| 0 
| 0 
| style="background:#DCDCDC"| 0 
| style="background:#DCDCDC"| 0 
| style="background:#DCDCDC"| 0 
| 0 
| 0 
| 0 
| style="background:#DCDCDC"| 0 
| style="background:#DCDCDC"| 0 
| style="background:#DCDCDC"| 0 
| 
|-
! colspan="19"| Midfielders
|-
| 2
| 
| Victor Wanyama
| style="background:#DCDCDC"| 24 
| style="background:#DCDCDC"| 2160 
| style="background:#DCDCDC"| 2 
| 21 
| 1890 
| 2 
| style="background:#DCDCDC"| 0 
| style="background:#DCDCDC"| 0 
| style="background:#DCDCDC"| 0 
| 2 
| 180 
| 0 
| style="background:#DCDCDC"| 1 
| style="background:#DCDCDC"| 90 
| style="background:#DCDCDC"| 0 
| 
|-
| 6
| 
| Samuel Piette
| style="background:#DCDCDC"| 27 
| style="background:#DCDCDC"| 2383
| style="background:#DCDCDC"| 1 
| 22 
| 1943 
| 1 
| style="background:#DCDCDC"| 0 
| style="background:#DCDCDC"| 0 
| style="background:#DCDCDC"| 0 
| 4 
| 353 
| 0 
| style="background:#DCDCDC"| 1 
| style="background:#DCDCDC"| 87 
| style="background:#DCDCDC"| 0 
| 
|-
| 14
| 
| Amar Sejdič
| style="background:#DCDCDC"| 18 
| style="background:#DCDCDC"| 1022 
| style="background:#DCDCDC"| 3 
| 14 
| 685 
| 2 
| style="background:#DCDCDC"| 1 
| style="background:#DCDCDC"| 90 
| style="background:#DCDCDC"| 0 
| 3 
| 247 
| 1 
| style="background:#DCDCDC"| 0 
| style="background:#DCDCDC"| 0 
| style="background:#DCDCDC"| 0 
| 
|-
| 17
| 
| Ballou Tabla
| style="background:#DCDCDC"| 7 
| style="background:#DCDCDC"| 137 
| style="background:#DCDCDC"| 1 
| 5 
| 100 
| 1 
| style="background:#DCDCDC"| 0 
| style="background:#DCDCDC"| 0 
| style="background:#DCDCDC"| 0 
| 2 
| 37 
| 0 
| style="background:#DCDCDC"| 0 
| style="background:#DCDCDC"| 0 
| style="background:#DCDCDC"| 0 
| 
|-
| 19
| 
| Steeven Saba
| style="background:#DCDCDC"| 0 
| style="background:#DCDCDC"| 0 
| style="background:#DCDCDC"| 0 
| 0 
| 0 
| 0 
| style="background:#DCDCDC"| 0 
| style="background:#DCDCDC"| 0 
| style="background:#DCDCDC"| 0 
| 0 
| 0 
| 0 
| style="background:#DCDCDC"| 0 
| style="background:#DCDCDC"| 0 
| style="background:#DCDCDC"| 0 
| 
|-
| 25
| 
| Emanuel Maciel
| style="background:#DCDCDC"| 12 
| style="background:#DCDCDC"| 837 
| style="background:#DCDCDC"| 0 
| 11 
| 780 
| 0 
| style="background:#DCDCDC"| 1 
| style="background:#DCDCDC"| 57 
| style="background:#DCDCDC"| 0 
| 0 
| 0 
| 0 
| style="background:#DCDCDC"| 0 
| style="background:#DCDCDC"| 0 
| style="background:#DCDCDC"| 0 
| 
|-
| 27
| 
| Clément Bayiha
| style="background:#DCDCDC"| 4 
| style="background:#DCDCDC"| 66 
| style="background:#DCDCDC"| 0 
| 4 
| 66 
| 0 
| style="background:#DCDCDC"| 0 
| style="background:#DCDCDC"| 0 
| style="background:#DCDCDC"| 0 
| 0 
| 0 
| 0 
| style="background:#DCDCDC"| 0 
| style="background:#DCDCDC"| 0 
| style="background:#DCDCDC"| 0 
| 
|-
| 28
| 
| Shamit Shome
| style="background:#DCDCDC"| 13 
| style="background:#DCDCDC"| 372 
| style="background:#DCDCDC"| 0 
| 12 
| 282 
| 0 
| style="background:#DCDCDC"| 0 
| style="background:#DCDCDC"| 0 
| style="background:#DCDCDC"| 0 
| 1 
| 90 
| 0 
| style="background:#DCDCDC"| 0 
| style="background:#DCDCDC"| 0 
| style="background:#DCDCDC"| 0 
| 
|-
| 29
| 
| Mathieu Choinière
| style="background:#DCDCDC"| 0 
| style="background:#DCDCDC"| 0 
| style="background:#DCDCDC"| 0 
| 0 
| 0 
| 0 
| style="background:#DCDCDC"| 0 
| style="background:#DCDCDC"| 0 
| style="background:#DCDCDC"| 0 
| 0 
| 0 
| 0 
| style="background:#DCDCDC"| 0 
| style="background:#DCDCDC"| 0 
| style="background:#DCDCDC"| 0 
| 
|-
| 34
| 
| Tomas Giraldo
| style="background:#DCDCDC"| 0 
| style="background:#DCDCDC"| 0 
| style="background:#DCDCDC"| 0 
| 0 
| 0 
| 0 
| style="background:#DCDCDC"| 0 
| style="background:#DCDCDC"| 0 
| style="background:#DCDCDC"| 0 
| 0 
| 0 
| 0 
| style="background:#DCDCDC"| 0 
| style="background:#DCDCDC"| 0 
| style="background:#DCDCDC"| 0 
| 
|-
! colspan="19"| Forwards
|-
| 9
| 
| Bojan Krkić
| style="background:#DCDCDC"| 20 
| style="background:#DCDCDC"| 1481 
| style="background:#DCDCDC"| 4 
| 16 
| 1159 
| 4 
| style="background:#DCDCDC"| 1 
| style="background:#DCDCDC"| 90 
| style="background:#DCDCDC"| 0 
| 2 
| 168 
| 0 
| style="background:#DCDCDC"| 1 
| style="background:#DCDCDC"| 64 
| style="background:#DCDCDC"| 0 
| 
|-
| 11
| 
| Anthony Jackson-Hamel
| style="background:#DCDCDC"| 12 
| style="background:#DCDCDC"| 356 
| style="background:#DCDCDC"| 0 
| 7 
| 195 
| 0 
| style="background:#DCDCDC"| 1 
| style="background:#DCDCDC"| 57 
| style="background:#DCDCDC"| 0 
| 3 
| 78 
| 0 
| style="background:#DCDCDC"| 1 
| style="background:#DCDCDC"| 26 
| style="background:#DCDCDC"| 0 
| 
|-
| 13
| 
| Mason Toye
| style="background:#DCDCDC"| 8 
| style="background:#DCDCDC"| 241 
| style="background:#DCDCDC"| 0 
| 6 
| 152 
| 0 
| style="background:#DCDCDC"| 1 
| style="background:#DCDCDC"| 33 
| style="background:#DCDCDC"| 0 
| 1 
| 56 
| 0 
| style="background:#DCDCDC"| 0 
| style="background:#DCDCDC"| 0 
| style="background:#DCDCDC"| 0 
| 
|-
| 18
| 
| Orji Okwonkwo
| style="background:#DCDCDC"| 18 
| style="background:#DCDCDC"| 729 
| style="background:#DCDCDC"| 2 
| 13 
| 488 
| 1 
| style="background:#DCDCDC"| 1 
| style="background:#DCDCDC"| 33 
| style="background:#DCDCDC"| 0 
| 3 
| 163 
| 1 
| style="background:#DCDCDC"| 1 
| style="background:#DCDCDC"| 45 
| style="background:#DCDCDC"| 0 
| 
|-
| 21
| 
| Lassi Lappalainen
| style="background:#DCDCDC"| 14 
| style="background:#DCDCDC"| 697 
| style="background:#DCDCDC"| 4 
| 13 
| 679 
| 4 
| style="background:#DCDCDC"| 0 
| style="background:#DCDCDC"| 0 
| style="background:#DCDCDC"| 0 
| 0 
| 0 
| 0 
| style="background:#DCDCDC"| 1 
| style="background:#DCDCDC"| 18 
| style="background:#DCDCDC"| 0 
| 
|-
| 30
| 
| Romell Quioto
| style="background:#DCDCDC"| 25 
| style="background:#DCDCDC"| 1986 
| style="background:#DCDCDC"| 10 
| 19 
| 1483 
| 8 
| style="background:#DCDCDC"| 1 
| style="background:#DCDCDC"| 90 
| style="background:#DCDCDC"| 1 
| 4 
| 323 
| 1 
| style="background:#DCDCDC"| 1 
| style="background:#DCDCDC"| 90 
| style="background:#DCDCDC"| 0 
| 
|-
| 35
| 
| Jean-Aniel Assi
| style="background:#DCDCDC"| 1 
| style="background:#DCDCDC"| 7 
| style="background:#DCDCDC"| 0 
| 0 
| 0 
| 0 
| style="background:#DCDCDC"| 0 
| style="background:#DCDCDC"| 0 
| style="background:#DCDCDC"| 0 
| 1 
| 7 
| 0 
| style="background:#DCDCDC"| 0 
| style="background:#DCDCDC"| 0 
| style="background:#DCDCDC"| 0 
| 
|-
| 37
| 
| Maximiliano Urruti
| style="background:#DCDCDC"| 18 
| style="background:#DCDCDC"| 1017 
| style="background:#DCDCDC"| 5 
| 15 
| 894 
| 5 
| style="background:#DCDCDC"| 0 
| style="background:#DCDCDC"| 0 
| style="background:#DCDCDC"| 0 
| 2 
| 120 
| 0 
| style="background:#DCDCDC"| 1 
| style="background:#DCDCDC"| 3 
| style="background:#DCDCDC"| 0 
| 
|-
! colspan="19"| No Longer with the Club
|-
| 8
| 
| Saphir Taïder
| style="background:#DCDCDC"| 14 
| style="background:#DCDCDC"| 1158 
| style="background:#DCDCDC"| 5 
| 11 
| 955 
| 4 
| style="background:#DCDCDC"| 0 
| style="background:#DCDCDC"| 0 
| style="background:#DCDCDC"| 0 
| 2 
| 113 
| 1 
| style="background:#DCDCDC"| 1 
| style="background:#DCDCDC"| 90 
| style="background:#DCDCDC"| 0 
| 
|-
! colspan="19"| Last updated: December 16, 2020
|}

Top scorers

{| class="wikitable sortable alternance"  style="font-size:85%; text-align:center; line-height:14px; width:85%;"
|-
!width=10|Rank
!width=10|Nat.
! scope="col" style="width:275px;"|Player
!width=10|Pos.
!width=80|MLS
!width=80|MLS Cup Playoffs
!width=80|Champions League
!width=80|TOTAL
|-
|1||  || Romell Quioto                || FW ||8 ||1 ||1 || 10
|-
|2||  || Maximiliano Urruti           || FW ||5 || ||  || 5
|-
|2||  || Saphir Taïder                || FW ||4 || ||1 || 5
|-
|4||  || Lassi Lappalainen            || FW ||4 || ||  || 4
|-
|4||  || Bojan Krkić                  || FW ||4 || ||  || 4
|-
|6||  || Amar Sejdič                || MF ||2 || || 1|| 3
|-
|7||  || Victor Wanyama               || MF ||2 || ||  || 2
|-
|7||  || Orji Okwonkwo            || FW ||1 || ||1 || 2
|-
|9||  || Rudy Camacho                 || DF ||1 || ||  || 1
|-
|9||  || Samuel Piette                || MF ||1 || ||  || 1
|-
|9||  || Ballou Tabla                || MF ||1 || ||  || 1
|-
|- class="sortbottom"
| colspan="4"|Totals|| 33 || 1 ||4 ||38

Italic: denotes player left the club during the season.

 Top Assists 

{| class="wikitable sortable alternance"  style="font-size:85%; text-align:center; line-height:14px; width:85%;"
|-
!width=10|Rank
!width=10|Nat.
! scope="col" style="width:275px;"|Player
!width=10|Pos.
!width=80|MLS
!width=80|MLS Cup Playoffs
!width=80|Champions League
!width=80|TOTAL
|-
|1||  || Romell Quioto                 || FW || 6|| || || 6
|-
|1||  || Saphir Taïder''             || MF ||6 || || || 6
|-
|3||  || Emanuel Maciel                || MF ||3 || || || 3
|-
|3||  || Victor Wanyama                || MF ||2 || || 1|| 3
|-
|3||  || Bojan Krkić                 || FW || 2|| ||1 || 3
|-
|6||  || Orji Okwonkwo             || FW ||2 || || || 2
|-
|6||  || Maximiliano Urruti            || FW || 2|| || || 2
|-
|8||  || Joel Waterman                 || DF ||1 || || || 1
|-
|8||  || Jorge Corrales                || DF ||1 || || || 1
|-
|8||  || Lassi Lappalainen             || FW ||1 || || || 1
|-
|8||  || Samuel Piette                 || MF ||1 || || || 1
|-
|8||  || Zachary Brault-Guillard       || DF || 1|| || || 1
|-
|8||  || Mason Toye                    || FW ||1 || || || 1
|-
|8||  || Mustafa Kizza                 || DF || 1|| || || 1
|-
|8||  || Rudy Camacho                  || DF || ||1 || || 1
|- 
|8||  || Amar Sejdič                 || MF || ||1 || || 1
|-
|- class="sortbottom"
| colspan="4"|Totals|| 30 || 2 ||2 ||34Italic: denotes player left the club during the season.

 Goals Against Average 

{| border="1" cellpadding="4" cellspacing="0" style="margin: 1em 1em 1em 1em 0; background: #f9f9f9; border: 1px #aaa solid; border-collapse: collapse; font-size: 95%; text-align: center;"
|-
| rowspan="2" style="width:1%; text-align:center;"|No.| rowspan="2" style="width:90px; text-align:center;"|Nat.| rowspan="2" style="width:25%; text-align:center;"|Player| colspan="3" style="text-align:center;"|Total| colspan="3" style="text-align:center;"|Major League Soccer| colspan="3" style="text-align:center;"|MLS Cup Playoffs| colspan="3" style="text-align:center;"|Champions League| colspan="3" style="text-align:center;"|MLS is Back Knockout|-
|MIN|GA|GAA|MIN|GA|GAA|MIN|GA|GAA|MIN|GA|GAA|MIN|GA|GAA|-
| style="text-align: right;" |23
|
| style="text-align: left;" |Clément Diop
|2340|43|1.65|1800
|36
|1.80
|90
|2
|2.00
|360
|4
|1.00
|90
|1
|1.00
|-
| style="text-align: right;" |40
|
| style="text-align: left;" |Jonathan Sirois
|0|0|0.00|0
|0
|0.00
|0
|0
|0.00
|0
|0
|0.00
|0
|0
|0.00
|-
| style="text-align: right;" |41
|
| style="text-align: left;" |James Pantemis
|270|7|2.33|270
|7
|2.33
|0
|0
|0.00
|0
|0
|0.00
|0
|0
|0.00

Italic: denotes player left the club during the season.

 Clean sheets 

{| class="wikitable sortable alternance"  style="font-size:85%; text-align:center; line-height:14px; width:85%;"
|-
!width=10|No.
!width=10|Nat.
! scope="col" style="width:225px;"|Player
!width=80|MLS
!width=80|MLS Cup Playoffs
!width=80|Champions League
!width=80|TOTAL
|-
|23||  || Clément Diop               || 3 || || 2  ||5
|-
|- class="sortbottom"
| colspan="3"|Totals|| 3 || 0 ||2  || 5'''

Top minutes played 

{| class="wikitable sortable alternance"  style="font-size:85%; text-align:center; line-height:14px; width:80%;"
|-
!width=10|No.
!width=10|Nat.
!scope="col" style="width:275px;"|Player
!width=10|Pos.
!width=80|MLS
!width=80|MLS Cup Playoffs
!width=80|Champions League
!width=80|MLS is Back Knockout
!width=80|TOTAL
|-
|6 ||  || Samuel Piette              || MF || 1943 ||     || 353 || 87 || 2383
|-
|23||  || |Clément Diop              || GK || 1800 || 90  || 360 || 90 || 2340
|-
|15||  || Zachary Brault-Guillard    || DF || 1789 || 90  || 315 || 90 || 2284
|-
|5 ||  || Luis Binks                 || DF || 1762 || 90  || 270 || 90 || 2212
|-
|2 ||  || Victor Wanyama             || MF || 1890 ||     || 180  || 90 || 2160
|-
|30||  || Romell Quioto              || FW || 1483 || 90  || 323 || 90 || 1986
|-
|22||  || Jukka Raitala              || DF || 1350 ||     || 135 || 45 || 1530
|-
|9 ||  || Bojan          || FW || 1159 || 90  || 168 || 64 || 1481
|-
|26||  || Jorge Corrales             || DF || 1069 || 45  || 270 || 90 || 1474
|-
|4 ||  || Rudy Camacho               || DF || 1189  || 90  || 107||    || 1386
|-

Italic: denotes player left the club during the season.

Yellow and red cards

Recognition

Concacaf CL team of the Week

MLS team of the Week

MLS player of the Week

MLS goal of the Week

MLS 22 Under 22

Notes

References 

CF Montréal seasons
Montreal Impact
Montreal Impact
Montreal Impact
Montreal